Hendrella is a genus of tephritid  or fruit flies in the family Tephritidae.

Species
Hendrella adila (Richter, 1975)
Hendrella basalis (Hendel, 1927)
Hendrella caloptera (Loew, 1850)
Hendrella heringi (Hardy, 1970)
Hendrella ibis (Hendel, 1927)
Hendrella kermanensis Mohamadzade Namin, Madjdzadeh & Moeinadini, 2017
Hendrella quinquincisa Korneyev, 1989
Hendrella sinensis Wang, 1996
Hendrella sordida Korneyev, 1989
Hendrella trimaculata (Hardy, 1988)
Hendrella variegata Radhakrishnan, 1984
Hendrella winnertzii (Frauenfeld, 1864)

References

Tephritinae
Tephritidae genera
Diptera of Asia
Diptera of Australasia